Kentucky Route 78 (KY 78) is a  state highway in Kentucky that runs from KY 49 in rural Casey County northwest of Liberty to U.S. Route 150 (US 150) southeast of Stanford via Hustonville and Stanford.  Much of the route follows the old Cumberland Trail from Stanford, KY to Nashville, TN.

Major intersections

References

0078
Transportation in Casey County, Kentucky
Transportation in Lincoln County, Kentucky